The Diocese of Zululand is a diocese of the Anglican Church of Southern Africa which covers the part of the South African province of KwaZulu-Natal that lies to the northeast of the Buffalo and Tugela Rivers. It is divided in ten archdeaconries.

History 

The establishment of the Anglican Diocese of Zululand has its roots in the visit of John Colenso, bishop of Natal, to King Mpande kaSenzangakhona in 1859 to secure his permission for a Zulu Mission. Permission was granted and the macaigave Colenso land at for the establishment of a mission station.

In 1860, Colenso sent Robert Robertson from Umlazi Mission outside Durban, to start work at KwaMagwaza.  After Colenso was excommunicated by the Bishop of Cape Town, Robertson refused to continue to accept him as his bishop. In 1870 on the 8 May, at the Whitehall Chapel in London, Edward Wilkinson was consecrated as the first bishop of the new diocese. He was given the title of Bishop for the Zulus and the tribes towards the Zambezi.

The bishop settled at KwaMagwaza.  From there he trekked north, establishing missions in Swaziland and in Mpumalanga on his way to Pretoria.  The Anglo-Zulu War of 1879 saw all the mission buildings in Zululand burned to the ground, as well as a decisive Zulu victory against the British at the Battle of Isandlwana.  Law and order broke down and KwaMagwaza became a very unsettled area. This resulted in the removal of the diocesan centre to Isandlwana.  The second bishop, Douglas MacKenzie (1880), also made Isandlwana his headquarters and set up a training college there. The Cathedral of St. Michael and All Angels is located in Eshowe.

The diocese today 

Today the Diocese of Zululand comprises 283 congregations – from the Tugela River in the South to the borders of Mozambique and Swaziland in the North, and inland to the Diocese of the Highveld. Each parish has a number of out stations and the diocese is served both by a large number of committed priests and by the Sisters of the Holy Name, a community of Zulu nuns.

List of bishops 

 Edward Wilkinson 1870–1875
 Douglas MacKenzie 1880–1890
 William Carter 1891–1902
 Wilmot Vyvyan 1903–1929
 Charles Aylen 1930–1935
 Albert Lee 1935–1947
 Eric Trapp 1947–1957
 Tom Savage 1958–1966
 Alphaeus Zulu 1966–1975
 Lawrence Bekisisa Zulu 1975–1993
 Peter Harker 1993–1997
 Anthony Mdletshe 1997–2005
 Dino Gabriel 2005–2015
 Monument Makhanya 2016 -2019
 Vikinduku Mnculwane 2021

Coat of arms 
The diocese assumed arms around the time of its inception, and had them granted by the College of Arms in 1954 : Sable, a bamboo cross eradicated at the foot proper, on a canton Azure bordered Argent a mullet also Argent, a base Vert charged with an anchor Or.

References

External links 

 

1870 establishments in the Colony of Natal
Anglican Church of Southern Africa dioceses
Diocese of Zululand